The Secret Heart is a 1946 film directed by Robert Z. Leonard and starring Claudette Colbert, Walter Pidgeon and June Allyson.

Plot
Lee (Claudette Colbert) is engaged to marry Larry Adams (Richard Derr), a spendthrift widower with two children, son Chase (Robert Sterling) and daughter Penny (June Allyson). Lee had been living in England with her guardian aunt, who didn't approve of the match since Larry was an alcoholic, and while returning to America on an ocean liner, she meets Chris Matthews (Walter Pidgeon), a close friend of Larry's. Despite her loving feelings for Chris, she marries Larry, and moves to his farm in Rhode Island. Larry's talent is playing the piano, which he teaches Penny, but he gave up this ambition to work in a bank, to please his father. This frustrated ambition has ruined his life, and over the next two years Lee tries to confront his alcoholism, while trying to win Penny's confidence. While Lee is out for the night with Chris, Larry dies, his body found at the bottom of a cliff. He had committed suicide after two years of marriage, and on his death, it is reported that Larry had embezzled money from his clients. Lee sends Chris away and moves the family away from the farm, to New York where she takes a job to pay off Larry's debts, and withholds the truth from Penny, wanting to shield her from the stigma of scandal. Penny makes a hero out of Larry, who she believes died of a heart attack, and is unable to embrace Lee, who is now left to look after them alone.

Ten years later, Penny, who behaves strangely, has dropped out of school and plays the piano incessantly for her father's memory when nobody else is around, is the patient of psychiatrist Dr. Rossiger. Lee goes to see him, concerned about Penny's behaviour, and the story up to this point is recalled in flashback. The doctor advises that they move back to the farm for the summer, since that is where the death occurred, and he believes that confronting the past will help cure Penny. Chase returns from the navy after three years and seeks a job with Chris, who now owns a shipyard. He introduces Penny to his navy friend Brandon Reynolds. They all move to the farm, together with Chase's friend Kay Burns, where Chris reenters Lee's life after a ten-year absence, and Lee realizes that it was Chris she loved all along and let get away. Once at the farm, Penny becomes disenchanted with her father's memory when Chase tells her the truth, and becomes despondent, feeling that Chris is the only person she can confide in. Although Brandon is interested in Penny, she loves Chris, and is devastated when she finds him in Lee's arms. Penny then tries to kill herself by jumping off a cliff, as Larry had done, but Lee intervenes in time to prevent it. The healing process begins and when Lee tells Penny the complete story of her father's life, Penny is finally able to embrace Lee. At the end Penny graduates, having adopted Chris as her father, and resumes her romance with Brandon

Cast
 Claudette Colbert as  Leola 'Lee' Addams 
 Walter Pidgeon as  Chris Matthews 
 June Allyson as  Penny Addams 
 Lionel Barrymore as  Dr. Rossiger 
 Robert Sterling as  Chase N. Addams 
 Marshall Thompson as  Brandon Reynolds 
 Elizabeth Patterson as  Mrs. Stover 
 Richard Derr as  Larry Addams 
 Patricia Medina as  Kay Burns 
 Eily Malyon as  Miss Hunter 
 Dwayne Hickman as  Chase (as a Child)

Reception
The film earned $2,591,000 in the US and Canada and $1,309,000 elsewhere, resulting in a profit of $891,000.

References

External links

 
 
 
 

1946 films
1946 romantic drama films
American black-and-white films
American romantic drama films
Films directed by Robert Z. Leonard
Films scored by Bronisław Kaper
Films set in Rhode Island
Metro-Goldwyn-Mayer films
1940s American films